The 1983 Wimbledon Championships was a tennis tournament played on grass courts at the All England Lawn Tennis and Croquet Club in Wimbledon, London in the United Kingdom. It was the 97th edition of the Wimbledon Championships and were held from 20 June to 3 July 1983.

Prize money
The total prize money for 1983 championships was £978,211. The winner of the men's title earned £66,600 while the women's singles champion earned £60,000.

* per team

Champions

Seniors

Men's singles

 John McEnroe defeated  Chris Lewis, 6–2, 6–2, 6–2
 It was McEnroe's 5th career Grand Slam title and his 2nd Wimbledon title.

Women's singles

 Martina Navratilova defeated  Andrea Jaeger, 6–0, 6–3
 It was Navratilova's 18th career Grand Slam title and her 4th Wimbledon single's title.

Men's doubles

 Peter Fleming /  John McEnroe defeated  Tim Gullikson /  Tom Gullikson, 6–4, 6–3, 6–4
 It was Fleming's 5th career Grand Slam title and his 3rd Wimbledon title. It was McEnroe's 11th career Grand Slam title and his 5th Wimbledon title.

Women's doubles

 Martina Navratilova /  Pam Shriver defeated  Rosie Casals /  Wendy Turnbull, 6–2, 6–2
 It was Navratilova's 19th career Grand Slam title and her 9th Wimbledon title. It was Shriver's 4th career Grand Slam title and her 3rd Wimbledon title.

Mixed doubles

 John Lloyd /  Wendy Turnbull defeated  Steve Denton /  Billie Jean King, 6–7(5–7), 7–6(7–5), 7–5
 It was Lloyd's 2nd career Grand Slam title and his 1st Wimbledon title. It was Turnbull's 8th career Grand Slam title and her 2nd Wimbledon title.

Juniors

Boys' singles

 Stefan Edberg defeated  John Frawley, 6–3, 7–6(7–5)

Girls' singles

 Pascale Paradis defeated  Patricia Hy, 6–2, 6–1

Boys' doubles

 Mark Kratzmann /  Simon Youl defeated  Mihnea-Ion Năstase /  Olli Rahnasto, 6–4, 6–4

Girls' doubles

 Patty Fendick /  Patricia Hy defeated  Carin Anderholm /  Helena Olsson, 6–1, 7–5

Singles seeds

Men's singles
  Jimmy Connors (fourth round, lost to Kevin Curren)
  John McEnroe (champion)
  Ivan Lendl (semifinals, lost to John McEnroe)
  Guillermo Vilas (first round, lost to Nduka Odizor)
  Mats Wilander (third round, lost to Roscoe Tanner)
  Gene Mayer (withdrew before the tournament began)
  José Luis Clerc (first round, lost to Claudio Panatta)
  Vitas Gerulaitis (second round, lost to Mark Edmondson)
  Steve Denton (first round, lost to Chris Lewis)
  Jimmy Arias (withdrew before the tournament began)
  Johan Kriek (third round, lost to Robert Van't Hof)
  Kevin Curren (semifinals, lost to Chris Lewis)
  Brian Gottfried (fourth round, lost to Mel Purcell)
  Bill Scanlon (fourth round, lost to John McEnroe)
  Hank Pfister (second round, lost to Ricardo Acuña)
  Tim Mayotte (quarterfinals, lost to Kevin Curren)

Women's singles
  Martina Navratilova (champion)
  Chris Evert Lloyd (third round, lost to Kathy Jordan)
  Andrea Jaeger (final, lost to Martina Navratilova)
  Tracy Austin (withdrew before the tournament began)
  Pam Shriver (first round, lost to Iva Budařová)
  Bettina Bunge (first round, lost to Christiane Jolissaint)
  Wendy Turnbull (fourth round, lost to Billie Jean King)
  Hana Mandlíková (fourth round, lost to Jennifer Mundel)
  Sylvia Hanika (third round, lost to Jennifer Mundel)
  Billie Jean King (semifinals, lost to Andrea Jaeger)
  Barbara Potter (quarterfinals, lost to Andrea Jaeger)
  Virginia Ruzici (fourth round, lost to Yvonne Vermaak)
  Jo Durie (third round, lost to Eva Pfaff)
  Andrea Temesvári (third round, lost to Carling Bassett)
  Kathy Rinaldi (fourth round, lost to Kathy Jordan)
  Claudia Kohde-Kilsch (fourth round, lost to Martina Navratilova)

References

External links
 Official Wimbledon Championships website

 
Wimbledon Championships
Wimbledon Championships
Wimbledon Championships
Wimbledon Championships